The cabinet of Barbu Știrbey was the government of Romania from 4 June 1927 to 20 June 1927.

Ministers
The ministers of the cabinet were as follows:

President of the Council of Ministers:
Barbu Știrbey (4 - 20 June 1927)
Minister of the Interior: 
Barbu Știrbey (4 - 20 June 1927)
Minister of Foreign Affairs: 
(interim) Barbu Știrbey (4 - 20 June 1927)
Minister of Finance:
(interim) Barbu Știrbey (4 - 6 June 1927)
Mihai Popovici (6 - 20 June 1927)
Minister of Justice:
Stelian Popescu (4 - 20 June 1927)
Minister of War:
Gen. Paul Angelescu (4 - 20 June 1927)
Minister of Public Works:
(interim) Constantin D. Dimitriu (4 - 6 June 1927)
Pantelimon Halippa (6 - 20 June 1927)
Minister of Communications:
Constantin D. Dimitriu (4 - 20 June 1927)
Minister of Industry and Commerce:
Ludovic Mrazec (4 - 20 June 1927)
Minister of Public Instruction:
Nicolae Lupu (4 - 20 June 1927)
Minister of Religious Affairs and the Arts:
Alexandru Lapedatu (4 - 20 June 1927)
Minister of Agriculture and Property:
Constantin Argetoianu (4 - 20 June 1927)
Ministry of Labour, Social Insurance and Cooperation:
(interim) Alexandru Lapedatu (4 - 6 June 1927)
Grigore Iunian (6 - 20 June 1927)
Minister of Public Health and Social Welfare:
(interim) Nicolae Lupu (4 - 6 June 1927)
Ion Inculeț (6 - 20 June 1927)

References

Cabinets of Romania
Cabinets established in 1927
Cabinets disestablished in 1927
1927 establishments in Romania
1927 disestablishments in Romania